The Mesopelagic Waters is the third studio album that J. G. Thirlwell has issued under the pseudonym Manorexia. It was released on March 23, 2010 by Tzadik Records. It comprises music from the previous two Manorexia releases that has been arranged for strings, piano and percussion and re-recorded.

Track listing

Personnel 
Musicians
David Broome – piano
David Cossin – percussion, ocarina (3)
Felix Fan – cello
Ted Hearne – musical arrangements (1, 3, 4, 7, 8)
Leyna Papach – violin, backing vocals (3)
Elena Park – violin, backing vocals (3)
David Shohl – musical arrangements (2, 5, 6)
J. G. Thirlwell – sampler, keyboards, musical arrangements, producer, backing vocals (3), tin whistle (3), strings (8)
Karen Waltuch – viola, backing vocals (3)
Technical personnel
Heung-Heung Chin – design
Scott Hull – mastering
Marylène Mey – photography
John Zorn – executive producer

Release history

References

External links
 The Mesopelagic Waters at foetus.org

2010 albums
Albums produced by JG Thirlwell
Manorexia albums
Tzadik Records albums